Georgina Pope RRC (1862–1938) was a Canadian nurse who served with distinction in the Second Boer War and First World War.

Early life and upbringing 
Georgina Fane Pope was born January 1, 1862, in Charlottetown, Prince Edward Island.  The daughter of William Pope, a Father of Confederation, she was a product of P.E.I gentility and could have doubtlessly had a comfortable marriage and became an island socialite. However, she instead traveled to New York, where she trained as a nurse at Bellevue Hospital.

Career
After the training, she became the superintendent of the Columbia Hospital for Women, at Washington D.C., where she opened a school for nurses.

In October 1899, after completing nursing studies at Bellevue Hospital in New York City, she volunteered for nursing service in the Second Boer War.  Placed in command of the first group of nurses to go overseas, she served for more than a year in South Africa.  For the first five months she and four other volunteer nurses served at British hospitals north of Cape Town.  After, Pope and another sister proceeded north to Kroonstad where, despite shortages in food and medical supplies, took charge of a military hospital and successfully cared for 230 sufferers of enteric fever.

On September 21, 1901, Pope, along with two other nurses, Deborah Hurcomb and Sarah Forbes, received medals for their war service from the Duke of York, later King George V, during his tour to the Outposts of the British Empire.  She returned there in 1902 with the Canadian Army Nursing Service as senior sister in charge of a second group of 8 Canadian nurses.  She served at a hospital in Natal until the end of the war in May that year.
On October 31, 1902, she became the first Canadian to receive the Royal Red Cross, awarded to her for meritorious and distinguished service in the field.

In 1908 she was appointed first Matron of the Canadian Army Medical Corps.

In 1917, aged 55, Pope, although in poor health went to work near Ypres and served for the remainder of World War I until 1918.

Later life 
Pope served in England and France during the First World War.

Georgina Pope died June 6, 1938. She was granted a full military funeral.  Georgina is one of fourteen figures from Canada's military history commemorated at the Valiants Memorial in Ottawa.

Legacy 
In 2012 Canadian artist Laurie McGaw designed a five dollar coin in honour of four nurses.  Georgina Pope stands in the foreground of the coin in front of three others.  The coin is made of fine silver and is 99.99% pure, and its production was limited to 10,000.

References

Sources
 
 Collections Canada: Georgina Pope Government of Canada Archives
 War Museum of Canada: Georgina Pope War Museum of Canada

1862 births
1938 deaths
Canadian military nurses
Female wartime nurses
Military history of Canada
Canadian women in World War I
Canadian female military personnel
Persons of National Historic Significance (Canada)
People from Charlottetown
Female nurses in World War I
People of the Second Boer War
Members of the Royal Red Cross
Canadian women nurses